Bava Bavamaridi is a 1993 Telugu-language drama film directed by Sarath. It stars Krishnam Raju, Suman, Jayasudha and Malashri, with music composed by Raj–Koti. The film is produced by Editor Mohan, and C. M. Krishna under the M. M. Movie Arts banner. It is a remake of Tamil film Pandithurai (1992). The film was recorded as a Blockbuster at the box office.

Plot

Raghava Rao sees a young woman performing pooja at a temple, and instantly falls in love with her. This is Janaki, who belongs to a poor family, consisting of her dad, mom and younger brother named Raju. Raghava Rao sends an emissary to Janaki's Father, who is delighted to give his daughter to Raghava Rao in marriage, and the wedding is celebrated with due ceremony. Janaki is very fond of Raju and takes him along with her to her husband's house. This is the only "gift" that Jankai's impoverished parents are able to give their daughter at the wedding, and it is also beneficial for the young boy to grow up in a more affluent household. At the Raghava Rao's palatial home. After that they had a daughter named Geetha.

The years pass. Raju, now grown up, is intensely attached and loyal to his brother-in-law.  Geeta loves Raju. At first he does not accept because of his loyalty to his brother-in-law. After Seeing Geeta's true love he accepts her. Chintamani, a courtesan who sings and dances for a living. Chintamani has no relatives except one brother, an unscrupulous card-sharp named Bhoopathi who lives off his sister's earnings. Chintamani saves Raghava Rao from an accident where they planned and create situation that he make love with Chintamani. Her brother, posing as a respectable man, demands that Raghava Rao marry Chintamani and make the relationship public. Raghava Rao is reluctant. He is attached to his dutiful wife and loving brother-in-law. Raju is horrified to find relation between his brother-in-law and Chintamani. Raju falls at his feet and pleads with him not to take a second wife. His pleas fall on deaf ears; Raghava Rao decides to marry Chintamani. Raju tells his parents of what has happened. They come to Raghava Rao's mansion and create a scene. Annoyed at the commotion, he tells Jankai to make her choice once and for all: she can either accept Chintamani or depart with her parents for good. Jankai chooses to remain with her husband. After that Raju father died because of Shock. Raghava Raju also realises Geeta-Raju's love and he was not ready to give her daughter to Raju. All this creates enmity between Raghava Rao & Raju.

Bhoopathi reveals his plan to his sister and asks her to help him to abduct Raghava Rao's wealth, but Chintamani has undergone a personality change after realizing her mistake when Raghava Rao gave respect to her. She now wants to be a respectable woman and is extremely grateful to Him for having given her the chance to reform. She berates and opposes her brother, and makes it clear that she will inform Raghava Rao about his plan. Bhoopathi feels betrayed by his sister lost his only source of income, which was the money from his sister's song-and-dance performances. In a fit of rage, he plunges a knife into her stomach and kills her. He then makes an effort to frame Raghava Rao for Chintamani's murder.

At Climax Raju dispatches the villains,  where Janaki knows real murder of Chintamani and she announces in speaker where fight place in Temple. He fought with villains rescues Geeta and protects Raghava Rao's honour. Raghava Rao, now reconciled with his beloved and loyal Raju, gives Geeta in marriage to him.

Cast

Music
The music of the film was composed by Raj–Koti.

Awards 
 Suman won Nandi Award for Best Actor for his excellent performance in this film

References 

1993 films
1990s Telugu-language films
Indian romantic drama films
Films directed by Sarath
Films scored by Raj–Koti
Telugu remakes of Tamil films